In category theory, a branch of mathematics, a PROP is a symmetric strict monoidal category whose objects are the natural numbers n identified with the finite sets  and whose tensor product is given on objects by the addition on numbers. Because of “symmetric”, for each n, the symmetric group on n letters is given as a subgroup of the automorphism group of n. The name PROP is an abbreviation of "PROduct and Permutation category".

The notion was introduced by Adams and MacLane; the topological version of it was later given by Boardman and Vogt. Following them, J. P. May then introduced the notion of “operad”, a particular kind of PROP.

There are the following inclusions of full subcategories:

where the first category is the category of (symmetric) operads.

Examples and variants 
An important elementary class of PROPs are the sets  of all matrices (regardless of number of rows and columns) over some fixed ring . More concretely, these matrices are the morphisms of the PROP; the objects can be taken as either  (sets of vectors) or just as the plain natural numbers (since objects do not have to be sets with some structure). In this example:
 Composition  of morphisms is ordinary matrix multiplication.
 The identity morphism of an object  (or ) is the identity matrix with side .
 The product  acts on objects like addition ( or ) and on morphisms like an operation of constructing block diagonal matrices: .
 The compatibility of composition and product thus boils down to
 .
 As an edge case, matrices with no rows ( matrices) or no columns ( matrices) are allowed, and with respect to multiplication count as being zero matrices. The  identity is the  matrix.
 The permutations in the PROP are the permutation matrices. Thus the left action of a permutation on a matrix (morphism of this PROP) is to permute the rows, whereas the right action is to permute the columns.
There are also PROPs of matrices where the product  is the Kronecker product, but in that class of PROPs the matrices must all be of the form  (sides are all powers of some common base ); these are the coordinate counterparts of appropriate symmetric monoidal categories of vector spaces under tensor product.

Further examples of PROPs:
 the discrete category  of natural numbers,
 the category FinSet of natural numbers and functions between them,
 the category Bij of natural numbers and bijections,
 the category Inj of natural numbers and injections.

If the requirement “symmetric” is dropped, then one gets the notion of PRO category. If “symmetric” is replaced by braided, then one gets the notion of 
PROB category.

 the category BijBraid of natural numbers, equipped with the braid group Bn as the automorphisms of each n (and no other morphisms).
is a PROB but not a PROP.

 the augmented simplex category  of natural numbers and order-preserving functions.

is an example of PRO that is not even a PROB.

Algebras of a PRO 

For example:

See also 
 Lawvere theory
 Permutation category

References 

 

Monoidal categories